The 1972 Railway Cup Hurling Championship was the 46th series of the Railway Cup, an annual hurling tournament and organised by the Gaelic Athletic Association. The tournament took place between 26 January and 17 March 1972.

For the first time ever five teams participated. These included the four historic provinces of Ireland, Connacht, Leinster, Munster and Ulster, as well as a team representing the Combined Universities.

The tournament was won by Leinster.

Participants

Since the inaugural tournament in 1927 Connacht, Leinster and Munster had participated in every running of the championship since then. Ulster joined the tournament in 1944 and immediately became regular participants. In late 1971 an application from the Universities' Council to enter a Combined Universities team in both the hurling and Gaelic football Railway Cup competitions was discussed by the Central Council of the GAA. The proposal was readily accepted and the Combined Universities team was permitted to participate.

Results

Railway Cup

Top scorers

Championship

Media coverage

The Railway Cup final was broadcast live and in colour on RTÉ Television.

Railway Cup Hurling Championship
Railway Cup Hurling Championship
Hurling